The 2008–09 Djurgårdens IF Hockey season will be the club's 33rd season in the Swedish elite league Elitserien. The signing of David Schneider during late July 2008 is the first American player in the club's history to play for the club. The regular season started on home ice on September 18, 2008 against Luleå HF and will be concluded on February 28, 2009 away against Frölunda HC.

Offseason 
March 20: Team captain Jimmie Ölvestad re-signed a one-year contract with Djurgården.

April 15: Former assistant coaches Mikael Johansson and Tomas Montén signed a two-year contract as the new coaches of the team.

Pre-season

Nordic Trophy

Standings

Game log

Statistics

Goaltenders

Friendly games

Game log

Regular season

Standings

Game log

Stats

Skaters Top-10 
from stats.swehockey

Goaltenders

Transfers

Drafted players 
Djurgården players picked at the 2009 NHL Entry Draft.

References 

2008-09
2008–09 in Swedish ice hockey